The 2014–15 season is Inverness Caledonian Thistle's fifth consecutive season in the top flight of Scottish football and the second in the newly established Scottish Premiership, having been promoted from the Scottish First Division at the end of the 2009–10 season. Inverness also compete in the League Cup and the Scottish Cup.

Results & Fixtures

Pre-season

Scottish Premiership

Scottish League Cup

Scottish Cup

Player statistics

Captains

Appearances & Goals
Includes all competitive matches. 
Last updated 30 May 2015

|}

Hat-tricks

Disciplinary record
Includes all competitive matches. 

Last updated 30 May 2015

Team Statistics

League table

Position summary

Personnel Awards
Last updated 24 May 2015

Transfers

Players in

Players out

See also
 List of Inverness Caledonian Thistle F.C. seasons

References 

2013andndash;14
Inverness Caledonian Thistle